The thank offering (Hebrew: תֹּודָה, pronounced Todah) or sacrifice of thanksgiving (Hebrew zevakh hatodah זֶבַח הַתֹּודָה ) was an optional offering under the Law of Moses. This is also termed the "thanksgiving offering."

The Hebrew noun todah "thanksgiving" is derived from the Hiphil of the verb yadah (יָדָה) "to praise."

Commonly used as "Thank You" usually followed by bevakasha "You're Welcome"

References

External links
 From Jewish Passover to Christian Eucharist: The Story of the Todah, by the Catholic Education Resource Center

Jewish sacrificial law
Gratitude